Dean Wayne Gonzalez (January 3, 1958  August 13, 1994) was the co-author of "Introduction to Ada for Programmers" along with Dr. David A. Cook, a fellow faculty member at the United States Air Force Academy.

The son of Ivy Gonzalez (née Colbourne) of Newfoundland, Canada and Carmelo Gonzalez of Puerto Rico, Dean graduated from the United States Air Force Academy in May 1980 with honors as the outstanding graduating cadet in computer science.  He later obtained his master's degree from UCLA.  He later returned to teach at the academy, where he distinguished himself as a research faculty member and instructor.  Later, he became a successful civilian software engineer, working for Decision Science Applications, in Colorado Springs, Colorado.   The award which he won as the most outstanding graduating cadet in computer science now bears his name.

Killed during a hang-gliding accident in 1994, Dean Gonzalez is survived by his wife Gina and two children (Luci and Robert), two brothers (David and Darryl), a sister (Deborah), and his parents.

Books written
 Dean W. Gonzalez: Ada Programmer's Handbook, Benjamin-Cummings Publishing Company,

References

United States Air Force Academy alumni
1958 births
1994 deaths